Flank Island is the southernmost of the Myriad Islands, lying  east-northeast of the Snag Rocks in the Wilhelm Archipelago. It was mapped by the Falkland Islands Dependencies Survey from photos taken by Hunting Aerosurveys Ltd in 1956–57 and from the helicopter of HMS Protector in March 1958, and was named by the UK Antarctic Place-Names Committee because of its position.

See also 
 List of Antarctic and sub-Antarctic islands

References 

Islands of the Wilhelm Archipelago